Murray Hone Ball  (26 January 1939 – 12 March 2017) was a New Zealand cartoonist who became known for his Stanley the Palaeolithic Hero (the longest running cartoon in Punch magazine), Bruce the Barbarian, All the King's Comrades (also in Punch) and the long-running Footrot Flats comic series. In the 2002 Queen's Birthday and Golden Jubilee Honours, Ball was appointed an Officer of the New Zealand Order of Merit, for services as a cartoonist.

Life and work
Ball was born in Feilding in 1939; his father was All Black rugby player Nelson Ball. He grew up in New Zealand before spending some years in Australia and South Africa, where he attended Parktown Boys' High School and finished his education. He played for the Junior All Blacks in 1959 as a "first five-eighth" (number 10). As a young man he worked for the Dominion newspaper in Wellington and the Manawatu Times before becoming a freelance cartoonist and moving to Scotland, where he found work with publishers DC Thomson, of Dundee. 

He developed his character Stanley and had it published in the influential English humour-magazine Punch. Stanley the Palaeolithic Hero featured a caveman who wore glasses and struggled with the Neolithic environment. It became the longest-running strip in Punch'''s history, and other English and non-English speaking countries syndicated it. Ball continued to contribute to Punch after returning with his family to New Zealand.

Ball's early cartoons often had political overtones (his mid-70s UK strips included All the King's Comrades, and he described himself in the introduction to The Sisterhood (1993) as a socialist. Stanley often expresses left-wing attitudes.

In 2002 Ball was awarded the New Zealand Order of Merit.

Tributes paid to him included these:

Footrot Flats

After 1975 Ball wrote several comics in New Zealand (for instance 'Nature Calls'), but it was in 1976 that he first published the strip Footrot Flats in Wellington's afternoon newspaper, The Evening Post.  It rapidly led to the demise of his other strips including Stanley, which he was still writing for Punch.

The strip follows the adventures of a working sheep-dog called (if anything) "Dog" or "The Dog" or "@*&#!", his owner Wal Footrot and the other characters, human and animal, that they encounter or associate with. Ball expresses Dog's thoughts in thought-bubbles, though he clearly remains "just a dog" (rather than the heavily anthropomorphised creatures sometimes found in other comics or animation). Dog also has alter-egos including "The Grey Ghost" and "The Iron Paw".

Ball's Footrot Flats has appeared in syndication in international newspapers, and in over 40 published books. Footrot Flats inspired a stage musical,
a theme-park
and New Zealand's first feature-length animated film, Footrot Flats: The Dog's Tale (1986).  Footrot Flats characters include Wal, Dog, Cooch, Cheeky Hobson, Aunt Dolly, Horse, Pongo, Rangi, Charlie, Major, Jess and the Murphy family of Irish and Hunk and Spit.Footrot Flats features several remarkable traits: its expansive created-universe, complete with ancillary characters, things and places; the fact that the characters slowly but perceptibly age and mature throughout the twenty-year run of the comic; and the gradual encroachment of political themes over the years (particularly environmentalism and gentle parodies of feminism).

Ball said he wanted his cartoons to have an impact. "The heart of a cartoon is the idea, an artist can create a painting, hang it on the wall and be satisfied with what he has achieved even if no-one else sees it. In cartooning, you must get a human reaction to the idea. The task of the cartoonist is to translate his idea into a drawing that will have impact".

Death
Ball lived with his wife Pam on a rural property in Gisborne, New Zealand. In an interview on Radio New Zealand National on 27 January 2016, Pam said that Murray's health had been poor for the last six years and that he was suffering from dementia. Longtime friend and collaborator Tom Scott said that on Sunday, 12 March 2017, he had been advised that Ball had died. He is survived by his wife and children.

Bibliography
In addition to his cartoon collections, Ball wrote and illustrated eight books:

 Fifteen Men on a Dead Man's Chest, a satirical look at New Zealand rugby
 Migod! It's Bruce the Barbarian The People Makers (1970)
 The Sisterhood (1993)
 The Flowering of Adam Budd 
 Quentin Hankey: Traitor Tarzan, Gene Kelly And Me (2001) – approximately, an autobiography.
 Fred the (Quite) Brave MouseBall also wrote a large-format illustrated novel whose verse parodied the Australian bush-ballad as popularised by Banjo Paterson and Henry Lawson. Titled The Ballad of Footrot Flats, it was published in 1996. Originally intended as a second film script, this work was the first new Footrot material which Ball had published since 1994. It was the last of the Footrot series.

Interests
Murray Ball and Charles M. Schulz each admired the other's work. One Footrot Flats strip shows Dog laughing at a Snoopy cartoon. Schulz wrote the introduction to the only Footrot Flats published in the United States (it appeared as Footrot Flats there, but as Footrot Flats 4 in Australasia.)

See also
 New Zealand literature
 Footrot Flats, comic strip written by Murray Ball
 Footrot Flats: The Dog's Tale, 1986, animated film

References

External links
 Murray Ball: The man behind Footrot Flats'' biography
Footrot Flats by Murray Ball, a Facebook fan-site with a huge photographic catalogue of many Footrot Flats or Murray Ball items/merchandise

Tim Shoebridge. 'Ball, Murray Hone', Dictionary of New Zealand Biography, first published in 2022. Te Ara - the Encyclopedia of New Zealand,

1939 births
2017 deaths
Comic strip cartoonists
New Zealand cartoonists
People from Gisborne, New Zealand
Punch (magazine) cartoonists
Officers of the New Zealand Order of Merit
People from Feilding
Alumni of Parktown Boys' High School
New Zealand socialists